Chip and Dale (also spelled Chip 'n' Dale) are a cartoon duo of anthropomorphic chipmunks created in 1943 by The Walt Disney Company.

Concept 
The characters were first drawn by Bill Justice and introduced in the 1943 Pluto short Private Pluto, directed by Clyde Geronimi. In the short, they fight with Pluto about whether they can store their nuts in a military base cannon. Three years later, director Jack Hannah decided to use them as co-stars in Donald Duck shorts. Hannah said:

Of the two, Chip is portrayed as being safe, focused, and having a mind for logical scheming. Dale, by contrast, is more laid-back, dim-witted, and impulsive, and has a very strong sense of humor. Originally the two had a very similar appearance, but as a way to tell them apart, some differences were introduced: Chip has a small black nose and two centered protruding teeth, whereas Dale has a large dark red nose and a prominent gap between his buckteeth. Chip is also depicted as having smooth hair on top of his head while Dale's tends to be ruffled.

In most cartoons, they are paired with Mickey Mouse, or most often, Pluto and Donald Duck, whom they usually battle when they see an activity they do out of curiosity or when they try to get food without getting caught by them. They were given their own series in the 1950s, but only three cartoons resulted under their name: Chicken in the Rough (1951), Two Chips and a Miss (1952) and The Lone Chipmunks (1954). The duo was nominated for the Academy Award for Best Animated Short Film three times in four years: in 1946 for Squatter's Rights (against Mickey and Pluto), in 1947 for Chip an' Dale and in 1949 for Toy Tinkers (both against Donald Duck). In the 1980s, they became the lead characters of a half-hour television series, Chip 'n Dale: Rescue Rangers, in which they have adventures as leaders of a detective agency.

Their names may be a pun on the name of the 18th-century cabinet maker and furniture designer Thomas Chippendale, as suggested by Bill "Tex" Henson, a story artist at the studio.

List of Chip 'n' Dale shorts
Chip and Dale appear in the following 23 animated short films.

Home media
 The Adventures of Chip 'n' Dale – Includes Two Chips and a Miss, Chicken in the Rough, Chips Ahoy, Donald Applecore, Up a Tree, and The Lone Chipmunks plus various song scenes in between cartoon shorts sung by Chip 'n' Dale
 Classic Cartoon Favorites, Vol. 4: Starring Chip 'n' Dale (DVD)– Includes Chicken in the Rough, Chip an' Dale, Out of Scale, Two Chips and a Miss, Food for Feudin''', Working for Peanuts, Out on a Limb, Three for Breakfast and Dragon Around Nuts About Chip 'n' Dale – Includes Food for Feudin', Trailer Horn and Two Chips and a Miss A Tale of Two Chipmunks – Includes Chicken in the Rough, Chips Ahoy and The Lone Chipmunks (Also released on Laserdisc as a double feature along with "The Unsinkable Donald Duck")
 Disney Cartoon Classics Vol. 9: Starring Chip 'n' Dale – Includes Working for Peanuts, Donald Applecore and Dragon Around plus short scenes in between the cartoon shorts narrated by Jiminy Cricket, and is the only animation where Donald addresses the chipmunks by their names.

Comics series
Chip 'n' Dale also had their own comic book title, first from Dell Comics with Four Color Comics #517, 581,and 636, then their own title for issues #4–30 (1955–62), which was then continued by Gold Key Comics with #1–64 (1967–80), and later under its brand Whitman with #65–83 (1980–84).

TV series
Chip 'n Dale: Rescue Rangers

In 1989, Chip and Dale became the title characters in a new animated television series, Chip 'n Dale: Rescue Rangers, in which they formed a detective agency with new characters created for the show: female mouse inventor Gadget Hackwrench, muscular adventuring Australian mouse Monterey Jack, and Zipper the fly. While in the original shorts the duo are frequent troublemakers who are concerned only with themselves, in Rescue Rangers they are crime fighters who help the less fortunate.

In this series the personality differences between the two are more pronounced, with Chip as the serious, heroic leader and Dale as the quick-witted, hard partying reluctant hero. Additionally, they wear clothes in this series which reflect their personalities; Chip wears a leather jacket and fedora (much like Indiana Jones), while Dale wears a Hawaiian shirt (much like Magnum, P.I.).

DuckTales
Chip 'n' Dale, based on their Rescue Rangers iterations, made an appearance in the 2017 TV series DuckTales. Making their debut in the season 3 episode, "Double-O-Duck in You Only Crash Twice!", Chip 'n' Dale are depicted as ordinary chipmunks used as lab rats for an intelligence ray developed by the organization F.O.W.L. After becoming smarter and anthropomorphic, they teamed up with two mice and a fly to escape their confines as well as help Launchpad McQuack defeat one of F.O.W.L.'s agents. They also make a cameo appearance alongside the other Rangers in the series finale, "The Last Adventure!".

Chip 'n' Dale: Park Life

The characters have a French-American animated series called Chip 'n' Dale: Park Life, which was released on Disney+ on July 28, 2021, which was co-produced by The Walt Disney Company France and Xilam Animation. Unlike other iterations of the characters, the series is non-verbal, similarly to other shows produced by Xilam.

Film

A hybrid live-action / animated film, Chip 'n Dale: Rescue Rangers, was released in 2022, with animation of the characters provided by Moving Picture Company and their voices by John Mulaney and Andy Samberg.

Other appearances
Chip 'n' Dale were planned to appear as a cameo in the 1988 film Who Framed Roger Rabbit. They were supposed to be in the scene called "Acme's Funeral". However, this scene was cut from the final film. Storyboard artwork for this sequence survives, where they can be seen alongside characters such as Goofy, Horace Horsecollar, Clarabelle Cow, Tom Cat, Jerry Mouse, Herman and Katnip, Popeye, Bluto, Felix the Cat, Porky Pig, Petunia Pig, Sylvester the Cat, Yosemite Sam, Foghorn Leghorn, Casper the Friendly Ghost and Droopy.

Chip 'n' Dale occasionally appeared in Mickey Mouse Works and Disney's House of Mouse. They can also be spotted in the 1983 featurette Mickey's Christmas Carol where they are seen dancing to the music inside Fezziwigs. They also appear at all the Disney Parks as well.

Voice actors
The classic voices of Chip 'n' Dale were mostly provided by Jimmy MacDonald, Dessie (Flynn) Miller, and Helen Silbert. The earliest voices were provided by female office staff, without credit. In Private Pluto the chipmunks' speech was created by speeding up sound clips of normal speech. In a number of the shorts that followed, many of these same sound clips were used again, though later shorts used dialogue specifically recorded for that short.

At one point in Winter Storage, Chip and Dale get into an argument while caught in a trap. When the scene switches to an outside view of the box (with Donald Duck sitting on the box), the dialogue being heard is actually a sped-up segment of the voice-over narration (done by John Brown) from the Goofy short A Knight for a Day.

Since 1989, Chip and Dale have been voiced by Tress MacNeille and Corey Burton respectively, although MacNeille has provided the voice for both in Mickey Mouse Works and House of Mouse''. John Mulaney and Andy Samberg voiced the two in the Chip 'n Dale: Rescue Rangers live-action film. In the film, the high-pitched voices of the television series were explained as an act by the otherwise normally speaking chipmunks.

See also
 Complete list of Disney animated shorts

References

External links

 Chip 'n' Dale Online
  (Chip)
  (Dale)
 Chip on IMDb
 Dale on IMDb
 Disney Archive Entry

Animated duos
Anthropomorphic rodents
Dell Comics titles
Disney comics characters
Disney core universe characters
Fictional characters from Calisota
Fictional chipmunks
Fictional duos
Film characters introduced in 1943
Comics characters introduced in 1955
Gold Key Comics titles
Male characters in animation
Male characters in comics